The Comrat Republic was an autonomous republic established in the village of Comrat, in the Bessarabia Governorate, in protest of the tsarist regime of the Russian Empire. It was created after a mutiny by Andrey Galatsan, a socialist revolutionary, with the support of the local Gagauz population. It lasted six days (from 6 January to 12 January) and is today viewed positively in Gagauzia (now in Moldova) as a premonition of the future Gagauz territorial autonomy.

History

In 1905, following the arrival of the 1905 Russian Revolution, the Gagauz people began to call for the abolition of tsarism in the Russian Empire. Thus, Andrey Galatsan, a student at the Kharkiv Polytechnic Institute and a revolutionary socialist, created a clandestine organization in the village of Comrat, with a Gagauz ethnic majority. Galatsan began to urge the Gagauz peasant population to join his fight for rights. Protests by them began, and they started demanding to stop the recruitment of Gagauz people into the Imperial Russian Army, education in the Gagauz language, free medical care and others. During this period, the idea of Gagauz territorial autonomy began to be considered for the first time.

On 6 January 1906, a demonstration began in Comrat that escalated into mutiny, with Galatsan's supporters overthrowing the local authorities and proclaiming the Comrat Republic. A committee under Galatsan's rule was established, and its first decisions were to repeal taxes, cancel IOUs and perform a land reform. Later, on 10 January, a Russian newspaper reported "Comrat, with a population of 10,000, is in the hands of the insurgents. Autonomy has been proclaimed. The authorities have been fired and arrested. The dragoons (a mounted infantry) are unarmed". The flag of the Socialist Revolutionary Party, a red flag with the Russian-language slogan  ("Through struggle you will attain your rights") printed on it, was promoted as a central symbol of the republic.

On 12 January, after six days, the rebellion was suppressed. Galatsan and several of his companions were tried for sedition and deported to Siberia.

During the times of the Soviet Union, the Comrat Republic was presented as a socialist and proletarian movement but not as an ethnic one. However, since the proclamation of the Autonomous Territorial Unit of Gagauzia, it has been regarded as a "sign" or "premonition", highlighting its socialist characteristics but especially the ethnic Gagauz ones. Today, one of the streets of Comrat is named after Galatsan.

See also
Gagauz Republic
History of Gagauzia

Notes

References

History of Gagauzia
Former republics
Bendersky Uyezd
Peasant revolts
1905 Russian Revolution
States and territories established in 1906
States and territories disestablished in 1906
1906 establishments in the Russian Empire 
1906 disestablishments in the Russian Empire